Jayakrishnan (born 11 April 1974) is an Indian film and television actor known for his work in the Malayalam industry. Often regarded as Immortal Star JK by the Malayalam film fanatics for his unaging appearance for decades.

He was introduced as an actor by cinematographer and director Sunny Joseph with the serial Ninavukal Novukal in 1997. He has performed various roles throughout his career.

Jayakrishnan has also starred in other regional industries, including Telugu and Tamil. He briefly worked as a television presenter as the host of Top 5 Movies for Surya TV. Some of his notable serials are Thaali, Mazhayariyaathe, Kavyanjaly, Kasthuri (Tamil), and Abirami (Tamil).

Early life 

Jayakrishnan was born on 11 April 1974 in a Hindu Nair family in Kuzhimattom, Kottayam to P.N Narayanan Kutty and the late Sreedevi. His father is a retired school teacher as well as a pranic healer. He has a sister named Jyothi, and sculpture artist K.S. Radhakrishnan is his cousin brother who took to painting inspired by Jayakrishnan's father.

Jayakrishnan received his school education at NSS High School, Kuzhimattom, where his father was an arts teacher. He graduated from NSS Hindu College, Changanassery. He developed a passion for acting from the theater performance arts club in his hometown; later he started out giving narrations for documentaries and made his acting debut on television in the serial Ninavukal Novukal by cinematographer and director Sunny Joseph.

Career 

Jayakrishnan's character in the serial Sooryakanthi (1998) gave him a break in the entertainment industry. He worked with production companies including Balaji Telefilms, Seven Arts, and Manorama Vision. Jayakrishnan  semi-retired from acting in serials after getting supporting roles from movies and concentrated on his business interests and social work. He has had supporting roles in films such as Irupathiyonnaam Noottaandu, Mask, Pulimurugan, Abrahaminte Santhathikal, Kanal, Red Wine, Simhasanam, How Old Are You?, Karmayodha, Parunthu, Naatturajavu, and Roudram.

Personal life 

Jayakrishnan married Priya in 2000, who holds a post graduate degree in library science and is a classical dancer. They have one son, Devanarayan, who was born in 2001. The couple lived separately for one year until 2011 when they filed for divorce by mutual consent.

Filmography

Film

Television Serials
Partial list

References

External links
 IMDb Profile

1970 births
Living people
Indian male film actors